Peter Jeremy William Huggins (3 November 1933 – 12 September 1995), known professionally as Jeremy Brett, was an English actor. He played fictional detective Sherlock Holmes in four Granada TV series from 1984 to 1994 in all 41 episodes. His career spanned from stage, to television and film, to Shakespeare and musical theatre. He also played the smitten Freddy Eynsford-Hill in the 1964 Warner Bros. production of My Fair Lady.

Early life
Jeremy Brett was born Peter Jeremy William Huggins at Berkswell Grange in Berkswell, then in Warwickshire. His birthdate was actually 3 November 1933, but it has also been stated as December 1933 or 1935, according to many sources. He was the son of Lieutenant Colonel Henry William Huggins, DSO, MC, DL (1890–1965), an Army officer, and Elizabeth Edith Cadbury Butler (1903–1959; of the confectionery dynasty). He had three older brothers: John, Patrick and Michael. The actor Martin Clunes is his nephew (or, according to other sources, either his cousin or cousin, once removed). Educated at Eton College, he claimed to have been an "academic disaster", attributing his learning difficulties to dyslexia. Brett belonged to the Woodmen of Arden, an archery club established in 1785. His father and brothers were also members.

Although he eventually developed precisely honed diction, he was born with rhotacism, a speech impediment which prevented him from pronouncing the "R" sound correctly. He underwent corrective surgery as a teenager and followed it with years of practising.

However, while at Eton he excelled at singing and was a member of the college choir. He was trained by Elsie Fogerty at the Central School of Speech and Drama, then based at the Royal Albert Hall in London, graduating in 1954, but his father had demanded that he change his name for the sake of family honour, so he took his stage name from the label of his first suit, "Brett & Co."

In 1959, while Brett was playing Hamlet, his mother was killed in a car crash in the Welsh mountains. This had a tremendous effect on Brett. Later in life, he spoke about the accident, its impact on him and consequently his performance; "my mother had been killed savagely in a car accident in 1959, and I was very angry about that, because my son, when she was killed, was only three months old. There was anger—it was interesting ... there was anger in me. And I think that came through. I felt cheated—I felt my mother had been cheated—the rage of that came through". He could not believe the circumstances and channelled his anger into his performance.

Career

Stage and screen
Brett made his professional acting debut in rep at the Library Theatre in Manchester in 1954, and his London stage debut with the Old Vic company in Troilus and Cressida in 1956. He made his first appearance in a major film with War and Peace (1956), which starred Audrey Hepburn.

 Also in 1956, he appeared on Broadway as the Duke of Aumerle in Richard II. In 1959, Brett had a singing role as the romantic lead of Archie Forsyth in the West End musical Marigold. Also in 1959, he played the part of Hamlet; however, on reflection, in a BBC2 television documentary Playing the Dane, Brett later said that "I don't think I was very good as Hamlet. I think I was too young. I was too young intellectually. I was too young philosophically. I was Byronic. I was very handsome. I had qualities, but I'd much rather see other people's [version]. I wasn't convinced by me". The respected theatre critic Harold Hobson wrote of Brett's portrayal that "the incestuous bed was the centre of his performance". He played many classical roles on stage, including about a dozen Shakespearean parts at the Old Vic, in New York and four while Brett was a member of the National Theatre Company from 1967 to 1970.

 From the early 1960s, Brett was often on British television. He starred in several serials, including as d'Artagnan in an adaptation of The Three Musketeers (1966). His highest profile film appearance was as Freddy Eynsford-Hill in My Fair Lady (1964), again with Audrey Hepburn. Although Brett sang well, as he later demonstrated when he played Danilo in a BBC Television broadcast of The Merry Widow (Christmas Day 1968), his singing in My Fair Lady was dubbed by Bill Shirley. Around this time, Brett was considered to replace Sean Connery as James Bond (007), but turned the part down, feeling that playing 007 would harm his career. George Lazenby was subsequently cast instead.

Some of his appearances were in classical comedic roles, such as Captain Absolute in a television version of The Rivals (1970) and Bassanio in William Shakespeare's The Merchant of Venice (1970) in a National Theatre Company production directed by Jonathan Miller, which also featured Laurence Olivier (as Shylock) and Joan Plowright (as Portia). This was adapted for television in 1973 with the same three leads. Brett joked that, as an actor, he was rarely allowed into the 20th century and never into the present day. He did, though, appear in a few contemporary guest roles, in a couple of the ITC series such as The Baron (1967) and The Champions (1969), wherein he was cast as swarthy, smooth villains. Brett also appeared in The Incredible Hulk ("Of Guilt, Models and Murder", 1977) and starred as Maxim in the 1979 adaptation of Daphne du Maurier's Rebecca opposite Joanna David.

Jeremy Brett's final, posthumous film appearance was an uncredited bit part as the artist's father in Moll Flanders, a 1996 Hollywood feature film starring Robin Wright Penn in the title role. The film (not to be confused with the 1996 ITV adaptation starring Alex Kingston) was released nearly a year after Brett's death.

Sherlock Holmes

Although Brett appeared in many different roles during his 40-year career, he is best remembered for his performance as Sherlock Holmes in The Adventures of Sherlock Holmes, a series of Granada Television films made between 1984 and 1994. These were adapted by John Hawkesworth and other writers from the original stories by Sir Arthur Conan Doyle. Even though he reportedly feared being typecast, Brett appeared in 41 episodes of the Granada series, alongside David Burke and, latterly, Edward Hardwicke as Doctor Watson. Jeremy Brett and Edward Hardwicke appeared on stage in 1988 and 1989 in The Secret of Sherlock Holmes directed by Patrick Garland.

After taking on the demanding role ("Holmes is the hardest part I have ever played—harder than Hamlet or Macbeth") Brett made few other acting appearances, and he is now widely considered to be the definitive Holmes of his era, just as Basil Rathbone was at the beginning of the 1940s and William Gillette during the first third of the 20th century. Brett had previously played Doctor Watson on stage opposite Charlton Heston as Holmes in the 1980 Los Angeles production of The Crucifer of Blood, making him one of only a small number of actors to play both Holmes and Watson professionally.

Brett had been approached in February 1982 by Granada Television to play Holmes. The idea was to make a totally authentic and faithful adaptation of the character's best cases. Eventually Brett accepted the role. He wanted to be the best Sherlock Holmes the world had ever seen. He conducted extensive research on the great detective and Sir Arthur Conan Doyle himself, and was very attentive to discrepancies between the scripts he had been given and Conan Doyle's original stories. One of Brett's dearest possessions on the set was his 77-page "Baker Street File" on everything from Holmes' mannerisms to his eating and drinking habits. Brett once explained that "some actors are becomers—they try to become their characters. When it works, the actor is like a sponge, squeezing himself dry to remove his own personality, then absorbing the character's like a liquid".

Brett was obsessed with bringing more passion to the role of Holmes. He introduced Holmes's rather eccentric hand gestures and short violent laughter. He would hurl himself on the ground just to look for a footprint, "he would leap over the furniture or jump onto the parapet of a bridge with no regard for his personal safety."

Holmes's obsessive and depressive personality fascinated and frightened Brett. In many ways Holmes's personality resembled the actor's own, with outbursts of passionate energy followed by periods of lethargy. It became difficult for him to let go of Holmes after work. He had always been told that the only way for an actor to stay sane was for him to leave his part behind at the end of the day, but Brett started dreaming about Holmes, and the dreams turned into nightmares. Brett began to refer to Holmes as "You Know Who" or simply "HIM": "Watson describes You Know Who as a mind without a heart, which is hard to play. Hard to become. So what I have done is invent an inner life". Brett invented an imaginary life of Holmes to fill the hollowness of Holmes's "missing heart", his empty emotional life. He imagined: "... what You Know Who's nanny looked like. She was covered in starch. I don't think he saw his mother until he was about eight years old ..." etc.While the other actors disappeared to the canteen for lunch, Brett would sit alone on the set reading the script, looking at every nuance, reading Holmes in the weekends and on his holidays."Some actors fear if they play Sherlock Holmes for a very long run the character will steal their soul, leave no corner for the original inhabitant", he once said, but: "Holmes has become the dark side of the moon for me. He is moody and solitary and underneath I am really sociable and gregarious. It has all got too dangerous".

A theatrical adaptation, The Secret of Sherlock Holmes, by Brett's friend, playwright Jeremy Paul, ran at Wyndham's Theatre in London's West End with Brett and Edward Hardwicke during 1988 and 1989; the production subsequently toured.

Brett's performance is regarded by many critics to have been their favourite rendition of Sherlock Holmes.

Private life and health problems
On 24 May 1958, Brett married the actress Anna Massey (daughter of actor Raymond Massey). Their son, David Huggins, born in 1959, is a British cartoonist, illustrator, and novelist. Brett and Massey divorced on 22 November 1962 after she claimed that he had left her for a man. In 1976, Brett married Joan Sullivan Wilson, who died of cancer in July 1985. Brett was in a romantic relationship with the actor Gary Bond, who died exactly one month after Brett. In the late 1970s, Brett was involved with Paul Shenar. 

In the latter part of 1986, Brett exhibited wild mood swings that alarmed his family and friends, who persuaded him to seek diagnosis and treatment for manic depression, also known as bipolar disorder. Brett was prescribed lithium tablets to fight this condition. He suspected that he would never be cured, and would have to live with his malady, look for the signs of his disorder, and then deal with it. He wanted to return to work, and to play Holmes again.

The first episode to be produced after his discharge was a two-hour adaptation of The Sign of Four in 1987. From then on, the changes in Brett's appearance and behaviour slowly became more noticeable as the series developed. One of the side effects of the lithium tablets was fluid retention; Brett was putting on weight and retaining water. The drugs were also slowing him down. According to Edward Hardwicke, Brett smoked up to 60 cigarettes a day, which "didn't help his health." He also had heart troubles. His heart was twice the normal size; he had difficulties breathing and needed an oxygen mask on the set. "But, darlings, the show must go on", was his only comment.

During the final decade of his life, Brett was treated in hospital several times for his mental illness, and his health and appearance visibly deteriorated by the time he completed the later episodes of the Sherlock Holmes series. At one point, during the final series, Brett collapsed on set. During his last years, he discussed the illness candidly, encouraging people to recognise its symptoms and seek help.

Death

Brett died on 12 September 1995 at his home in Clapham, London, from heart failure. His heart valves had been scarred by rheumatic fever contracted as a child, and on top of this he had been a heavy smoker throughout his life. His body was cremated.

One of his elder brothers, John, who was a minister, spoke at his youngest brother's memorial service on 29 November 1995.

Mel Gussow wrote in an obituary for The New York Times, "Mr. Brett was regarded as the quintessential Holmes: breathtakingly analytical, given to outrageous disguises and the blackest moods and relentless in his enthusiasm for solving the most intricate crimes."

Work

Stage

Film

Television films
.

See also
 List of Sherlock Holmes episodes starring Jeremy Brett, including brief episode summaries
 List of actors who have played Sherlock Holmes

Footnotes

References
Citations

Bibliography

Davies, David Stuart (1996). Bending The Willow: Jeremy Brett As Sherlock Holmes. Chester, England: Calabash Press. ISBN 1899562184 

Whittaker, Maureen (2019). Jeremy Brett: Playing a Part. London: MX Publishing. ISBN 978-1-78705-589-6

External links

 
 
 Jeremy Brett's Sherlock Holmes (Granada series)
 Jeremy Brett biography

1933 births
1995 deaths
Alumni of the Royal Central School of Speech and Drama
Bisexual male actors
English male film actors
English male musical theatre actors
English male stage actors
English male television actors
English LGBT actors
People educated at Eton College
People from the Metropolitan Borough of Solihull
People with bipolar disorder
20th-century English male actors
British expatriate male actors in the United States
20th-century English singers
20th-century British male singers
Male actors from Warwickshire
Massey family